Uri Gallin (also "Urion" Gallin; אורי גלין; June 29, 1928 – 4 April 2021) was an Israeli Olympic discus thrower.

Discus throw career
Gallin's personal best in the discus throw is 48.03, in 1956. He competed for Israel at the 1952 Summer Olympics in Helsinki at the age of 24.  He participated in the men's discus throw, coming in 32nd with a best distance of 40.76.

References 

1928 births
2021 deaths
Athletes (track and field) at the 1952 Summer Olympics
Israeli male discus throwers
Olympic athletes of Israel